The 1926–27 Washington Huskies men's basketball team represented the University of Washington for the  NCAA college basketball season. Led by seventh-year head coach Hec Edmundson, the Huskies were members of the Pacific Coast Conference and played their home games on campus in Seattle, Washington.

In the season finale at Oregon, Washington defeated the division-winning Webfoots.

References

External links
Sports Reference – Washington Huskies: 1926–27 basketball season
Washington Huskies men's basketball media guide (2009–10) – History

Washington Huskies men's basketball seasons
Washington Huskies
Washington
Washington